Ty States, given name Tyleen States (born October 10, 1991) is a Canadian Supermodel. Won model search in 2009 by model scout Chantale Nadeau in Toronto, Ontario. She quickly was signed to Supreme New York and Women Management in Milan and Paris.

Her agencies now include Chantale Nadeau (motheragent), Sutherland models, FM models and Modelwerk. She has appeared in Teen Vogue (2009) and numerous runway shows. Ty has worked for clients including Prada, Victoria's Secret and Neiman Marcus.

States is 175–180 cm (5'10) in height.

References

1991 births
Canadian female models
Living people